The Eskimo Prince Stakes is an Australian Turf Club Group 3  Thoroughbred horse race, for three-year-olds, with set weights with penalties conditions, over a distance of 1200 metres at Warwick Farm Racecourse in Sydney, Australia in February. Total prize money for the race is A$160,000.

History
The race is named after Eskimo Prince, who was the champion two-year-old in 1964, winning the Golden Slipper Stakes and continuing later in the year won the Canterbury Stakes and Rosehill Guineas.The horse was sold and stood at stud in the US and died in 1979 in Oklahoma. 
The race was part of the Canterbury Stakes Carnival and was raced at night.
From 2008–2010 the race was sponsored by the Widden Stud. The race was renamed to the Strada Stakes in honour of the winner of this race in 2006 who also stood as a sire at Widden Stud.

Name
1984–2000 - Eskimo Prince Quality Handicap
2001–2002 - Eskimo Prince Stakes
2003–2005 - 3com Stakes
2006–2007 - Eskimo Prince Stakes
2008–2010 - Strada Stakes
2011 onwards - Eskimo Prince Stakes

Distance
1984–1986 - 1280 metres
1987–1990 - 1200 metres
1991–2007 - 1100 metres 
2008 onwards - 1200 metres

Grade

1986–2014 -  Listed Race
2015 onwards - Group 3

Venue
 1984–1996 - Canterbury Park Racecourse
 1997–1999 - Rosehill Gardens Racecourse
 2000–2005 - Canterbury Park Racecourse 
 2006–2010 - Randwick Racecourse
 2011 - Warwick Farm Racecourse
 2012 - Randwick Racecourse
 2013 - Warwick Farm Racecourse
 2014–2015 - Rosehill Gardens Racecourse
 2016–2017 - Randwick Racecourse
 2018–2020 - Warwick Farm Racecourse
 2021 onwards – Randwick Racecourse

Records
In 2003 Dehero broke the course record for 1100 metres at Canterbury with a time of 1:03.05 which stood for eleven years and was broken in 2014.

Winners

2023 - Aft Cabin  
2022 - Paulele   
2021 - Peltzer   
2020 - abandoned   
2019 - Gem Song   
2018 - Kementari   
2017 - Man From Uncle   
2016 - Spill The Beans   
2015 - Scissor Kick      
2014 - El Roca                       
2013 - Ichihara           
2012 - Nobby Snip           
2011 - Agister             
2010 - The Mikado        
2009 - Bhutane Dane      
2008 - Tenant's Tiara      
2007 - Absolutelyfabulous  
2006 - Strada              
2005 - Snippetson           
2004 - Spark Of Life        
2003 - Dehero              
2002 - Red Hannigan        
2001 - National Saint     
2000 - Major              
1999 - Troon              
1998 - Noble Challenge    
1997 - Investigation       
1996 - Quick Flick         
1995 - Magic Winner       
1994 - Sympose           
1993 - Our Replica             
1992 - Yallah Lad         
1991 - Varikos            
1990 - Sir Laurence       
1989 - Ideal Score        
1988 - Royal Handout      
1987 - Cupillus           
1986 - All In A Name      
1985 - Pago's Yarn
1984 - Run Ashore

See also
 List of Australian Group races
 Group races

External links 
First three place getters Eskimo Prince (ATC)

References

Horse races in Australia